George Leslie Lee (1814 – 15 September 1897) was a member of the New Zealand Legislative Council from 24 July 1862 to 8 November 1870, when he resigned.

Lee represented the Oxford electorate on the Canterbury Provincial Council from April 1867 to October 1870. He was a member of the Executive Council from 10 June 1868 to 4 June 1869. He was the returning officer for many elections in the wider Christchurch area.

Lee died on 15 September 1897. He was survived by his wife; they had no children.

References 

1814 births
1897 deaths
Members of the New Zealand Legislative Council
Members of Canterbury provincial executive councils
Members of the Canterbury Provincial Council
19th-century New Zealand politicians